The Finnish Individual Speedway Championship is a Motorcycle speedway championship held each year to determine the Finnish national champion. It was first staged in 1955.

Winners

See also
Finland national speedway team

References

Finland